Derbyshire County Cricket Club in 1955 was the cricket season when the English club Derbyshire had been playing for eighty four years. It was their fifty-first season in the County Championship and they won ten matches and lost ten to finish eighth in the County Championship.

1955 season
 
Derbyshire played 28 games in the County Championship, one match against the touring South Africans and one match against Scotland. They won ten matches, lost ten matches and drew ten matches. Donald Carr took over the captaincy.  Arnold Hamer was top scorer and Cliff Gladwin took most wickets for the club. Derek Hall was the only player to make his first class debut in the Derbyshire team.

Matches

{| class="wikitable" width="100%"
! bgcolor="#efefef" colspan=6 | List of matches
|- bgcolor="#efefef"
!No.
!Date
!V
!Result 
!Margin
!Notes
|-
|1
|7 May 1955  
 | Middlesex    Lord's Cricket Ground, St John's Wood 
|bgcolor="#FFCC00"|Drawn
 |  
|    JA Young 5-43; HL Jackson 5-27; Moss 6-45 
|- 
|2
|11 May 1955  
 | South Africans  County Ground, Derby  
|bgcolor="#FFCC00"|Drawn
 |  
|    
|- 
|3
|14 May 1955  
 | Essex  Valentine's Park, Ilford  
|bgcolor="#FFCC00"|Drawn
 |  
|    C Gladwin 5-41; Bailey 5-56
|- 
|4
|18 May 1955  
 | Kent  Bat and Ball Ground, Gravesend  
 |bgcolor="#00FF00"|Won 
|  Innings and 51 runs
|   DC Morgan 109 
|- 
|5
|21 May 1955  
 | Yorkshire Queen's Park, Chesterfield 
|bgcolor="#FF0000"|Lost 
 |  139 runs
|    Appleyard 5-51 and 5-29 
|- 
|6
|25 May 1955  
 | Kent County Ground, Derby 
|bgcolor="#00FF00"|Won 
 |  Innings and 21 runs
|    HL Jackson 6-40; Ridgway 5-109
|- 
|7
|28 May 1955  
 | Warwickshire Edgbaston, Birmingham  
|bgcolor="#FFCC00"|Drawn
 |  
|    
|- 
|8
|1 Jun 1955  
 |  WorcestershireCounty Ground, New Road, Worcester 
 |bgcolor="#00FF00"|Won 
|  144 runs
|    Horton 5-123; E Smith 6-45 
|- 
|9
|4 Jun 1955  
 | Leicestershire Ind Coope Ground, Burton-on-Trent 
|bgcolor="#FFCC00"|Drawn
 |  
|    HL Jackson 5-59.; C Gladwin 5-59
|- 
|10
|8 Jun 1955  
 |  Gloucestershire  Ashley Down Ground, Bristol  
|bgcolor="#FFCC00"|Drawn
 |  
|    Wells 6-52 and 5-30; C Gladwin 5-28; E Smith 5-39
|- 
|11
|15 Jun 1955  
 | Essex   Queen's Park, Chesterfield 
|bgcolor="#FFCC00"|Drawn
 |  
|    Insole 104; E Smith 6-69; Preston 5-61
|- 
|12
|18 Jun 1955  
 | Glamorgan   Cardiff Arms Park  
 |bgcolor="#00FF00"|Won 
|  132 runs
|    
|- 
|13
|25 Jun 1955  
 | Lancashire Queen's Park, Chesterfield 
|bgcolor="#FF0000"|Lost 
 |  129 runs
|    Hilton 6-59; DB Carr 7-53; Collins 5-30
|- 
|14
|29 Jun 1955  
 | Glamorgan   County Ground, Derby 
|bgcolor="#FFCC00"|Drawn
 |  
|    A Hamer 111; Wooller 5-64; HL Jackson 5-39 
|- 
|15
|2 Jul 1955  
| Lancashire  Old Trafford, Manchester 
|bgcolor="#FF0000"|Lost 
 |  8 wickets
|    Grieves 137; Statham 5-57
|- 
|16
|6 Jul 1955  
| Hampshire County Ground, Southampton 
|bgcolor="#00FF00"|Won 
 |  26 runs
|    Sainsbury 5-45; DC Morgan 5-41 
|- 
|17
|9 Jul 1955  
| Leicestershire Bath Grounds, Ashby-de-la-Zouch  
|bgcolor="#FFCC00"|Drawn
 |  
|    DB Carr 146; V Jackson 100 
|- 
|18
|13 Jul 1955  
| Nottinghamshire  Trent Bridge, Nottingham 
 |bgcolor="#00FF00"|Won 
|  11 runs
|    A Hamer 227; Dooland 5-95; Smales 7-44 
|- 
|19
|16 Jul 1955  
| Hampshire Queen's Park, Chesterfield 
|bgcolor="#FF0000"|Lost 
 |  58 runs
|    E Smith 5-22
|- 
|20
|23 Jul 1955  
| Nottinghamshire  Rutland Recreation Ground, Ilkeston 
|bgcolor="#FFCC00"|Drawn
 |  
|    Poole 122; Matthews 6-65; Smales 6-91
|- 
|21
|27 Jul 1955  
| Northamptonshire  Queen's Park, Chesterfield  
|bgcolor="#FF0000"|Lost 
 |  6 wickets
|    Barrick 105 
|- 
|22
|30 Jul 1955  
| Warwickshire  County Ground, Derby 
|bgcolor="#FF0000"|Lost 
 |  164 runs
|    Hitchcock 110; HJ Rhodes 6-86 
|- 
|23
|3 Aug 1955  
 | Scotland  Grange Cricket Club Ground, Raeburn Place, Edinburgh  
|bgcolor="#00FF00"|Won 
 |  8 wickets
|    GL Willatt 133; E Smith 5-66 and 9-46; Kerrigan 6-87   
|- 
|24
|6 Aug 1955  
| YorkshirePark Avenue Cricket Ground, Bradford  
|bgcolor="#FF0000"|Lost 
 |  Innings and 94 runs
|    Sutcliffe 133; Close 6-63 
|- 
|25
|10 Aug 1955  
|  Sussex   County Ground, Derby 
|bgcolor="#FF0000"|Lost 
 |  49 runs
|    James 6-56; C Gladwin 6-44; DV Smith 5-58 
|- 
|26
|13 Aug 1955  
|  Worcestershire Park Road Ground, Buxton  
|bgcolor="#00FF00"|Won 
 |  7 wickets
|    C Gladwin 5-36 
|- 
|27
|20 Aug 1955  
 |Gloucestershire  County Ground, Derby 
|bgcolor="#00FF00"|Won 
 |  Innings and 36 runs
|    DB Carr 139; C Gladwin 7-16 
|- 
|28
|24 Aug 1955  
| Somerset Queen's Park, Chesterfield 
|bgcolor="#00FF00"|Won 
 |  115 runs
|    Lobb 5-41; C Gladwin 5-22
|- 
|29
|27 Aug 1955  
|  Sussex   County Ground, Hove 
|bgcolor="#FF0000"|Lost 
 |  94 runs
|    Oakman 102; Parks 101; E Smith 6-80; Marlar 5-58 and 7-98 
|- 
|30
|31 Aug 1955  
|  Surrey Kennington Oval 
|bgcolor="#FF0000"|Lost 
 |  8 wickets
|    Lock 5-37; Surridge 6-56 
|-

Statistics

County Championship batting averages

County Championship bowling averages

Wicket Keeping
George Dawkes 	Catches 52, Stumping 14

See also
Derbyshire County Cricket Club seasons
1955 English cricket season

References

1955 in English cricket
Derbyshire County Cricket Club seasons